Computational linguistics is an interdisciplinary field concerned with the computational modelling of natural language, as well as the study of appropriate computational approaches to linguistic questions. In general, computational linguistics draws upon linguistics, computer science, artificial intelligence, mathematics, logic, philosophy, cognitive science, cognitive psychology, psycholinguistics, anthropology and neuroscience, among others.

Sub-fields and related areas
Traditionally, computational linguistics emerged as an area of artificial intelligence performed by computer scientists who had specialized in the application of computers to the processing of a natural language. With the formation of the Association for Computational Linguistics (ACL) and the establishment of independent conference series, the field consolidated during the 1970s and 1980s.

The Association for Computational Linguistics defines computational linguistics as:

The term "computational linguistics" is nowadays (2020) taken to be a near-synonym of natural language processing (NLP) and language technology. These terms put a stronger emphasis on aspects of practical applications rather than theoretical inquiry. In practice, they have largely replaced the term "computational linguistics" in the NLP/ACL community, although they specifically refer to the sub-field of applied computational linguistics, only.

Computational linguistics has both theoretical and applied components. Theoretical computational linguistics focuses on issues in theoretical linguistics and cognitive science. Applied computational linguistics focuses on the practical outcome of modeling human language use.

Theoretical computational linguistics includes the development of formal theories of grammar (parsing) and semantics, often grounded in formal logics and symbolic (knowledge-based) approaches. Areas of research that are studied by theoretical computational linguistics include:
Computational complexity of natural language, largely modeled on automata theory, with the application of context-sensitive grammar and linearly bounded Turing machines.
Computational semantics comprises defining suitable logics for linguistic meaning representation, automatically constructing them and reasoning with them.
Applied computational linguistics has been dominated by statistical methods, like neural networks and machine learning, since about 1990. Socher et al. (2012) was an early deep learning tutorial at the ACL 2012, and met with both interest and (at the time) scepticism by most participants. Until then, neural learning was basically rejected because of its lack of statistical interpretability. Until 2015, deep learning had evolved into the major framework of NLP. As for the tasks addressed by applied computational linguistics, see Natural language processing article. This includes classical problems such as the design of POS-taggers (part-of-speech taggers), parsers for natural languages, or tasks such as machine translation (MT), the sub-division of computational linguistics dealing with having computers translate between languages. As one of the earliest and most difficult applications of computational linguistics, MT draws on many subfields and both theoretical and applied aspects. Traditionally, automatic language translation has been considered a notoriously hard branch of computational linguistics.

Aside from dichotomy between theoretical and applied computational linguistics, other divisions of computational into major areas according to different criteria exist, including:
 medium of the language being processed, whether spoken or textual: speech recognition and speech synthesis deal with how spoken language can be understood or created using computers.
 task being performed, e.g., whether analyzing language (recognition) or synthesizing language (generation): Parsing and generation are sub-divisions of computational linguistics dealing respectively with taking language apart and putting it together.

Traditionally, applications of computers to address research problems in other branches of linguistics have been described as tasks within computational linguistics. Among other aspects, this includes
 Computer-aided corpus linguistics, which has been used since the 1970s as a way to make detailed advances in the field of discourse analysis
 Simulation and study of language evolution in historical linguistics/glottochronology.

Origins
Computational linguistics is often grouped within the field of artificial intelligence but was present before the development of artificial intelligence. Computational linguistics originated with efforts in the United States in the 1950s to use computers to automatically translate texts from foreign languages, particularly Russian scientific journals, into English. Since computers can make arithmetic (systematic) calculations much faster and more accurately than humans, it was thought to be only a short matter of time before they could also begin to process language. Computational and quantitative methods are also used historically in the attempted reconstruction of earlier forms of modern languages and sub-grouping modern languages into language families. Earlier methods, such as lexicostatistics and glottochronology, have been proven to be premature and inaccurate. However, recent interdisciplinary studies that borrow concepts from biological studies, especially gene mapping, have proved to produce more sophisticated analytical tools and more reliable results.

When machine translation (also known as mechanical translation) failed to yield accurate translations right away, automated processing of human languages was recognized as far more complex than had originally been assumed. Computational linguistics was born as the name of the new field of study devoted to developing algorithms and software for intelligently processing language data. The term "computational linguistics" itself was first coined by David Hays, a founding member of both the Association for Computational Linguistics (ACL) and the International Committee on Computational Linguistics (ICCL).

To translate one language into another, it was observed that one had to understand the grammar of both languages, including both morphology (the grammar of word forms) and syntax (the grammar of sentence structure). To understand syntax, one had to also understand the semantics and the lexicon (or 'vocabulary'), and even something of the pragmatics of language use. Thus, what started as an effort to translate between languages evolved into an entire discipline devoted to understanding how to represent and process natural languages using computers.

Nowadays research within the scope of computational linguistics is done at computational linguistics departments, computational linguistics laboratories, computer science departments, and linguistics departments. 
Some research in the field of computational linguistics aims to create working speech or text processing systems while others aim to create a system allowing human-machine interaction. Programs meant for human-machine communication are called conversational agents.

Approaches

Just as computational linguistics can be performed by experts in a variety of fields and through a wide assortment of departments, so too can the research fields broach a diverse range of topics. The following sections discuss some of the literature available across the entire field broken into four main area of discourse: developmental linguistics, structural linguistics, linguistic production, and linguistic comprehension.

Developmental approaches

Language is a cognitive skill that develops throughout the life of an individual. This developmental process has been examined using several techniques, and a computational approach is one of them. Human language development does provide some constraints which make it harder to apply a computational method to understanding it. For instance, during language acquisition, children are largely only exposed to positive evidence. This means that during the linguistic development of an individual, the only evidence for what is a correct form is provided, and no evidence for what is not correct. This is insufficient information for a simple hypothesis testing procedure for information as complex as language, and so provides certain boundaries for a computational approach to modeling language development and acquisition in an individual.

Attempts have been made to model the developmental process of language acquisition in children from a computational angle, leading to both statistical grammars and connectionist models. Work in this realm has also been proposed as a method to explain the evolution of language through history. Using models, it has been shown that languages can be learned with a combination of simple input presented incrementally as the child develops better memory and longer attention span. This was simultaneously posed as a reason for the long developmental period of human children. Both conclusions were drawn because of the strength of the artificial neural network which the project created.

The ability of infants to develop language has also been modeled using robots in order to test linguistic theories. Enabled to learn as children might, a model was created based on an affordance model in which mappings between actions, perceptions, and effects were created and linked to spoken words. Crucially, these robots were able to acquire functioning word-to-meaning mappings without needing grammatical structure, vastly simplifying the learning process and shedding light on information which furthers the current understanding of linguistic development. It is important to note that this information could only have been empirically tested using a computational approach.

As our understanding of the linguistic development of an individual within a lifetime is continually improved using neural networks and learning robotic systems, it is also important to keep in mind that languages themselves change and develop through time. Computational approaches to understanding this phenomenon have unearthed very interesting information. Using the Price equation and Pólya urn dynamics, researchers have created a system which not only predicts future linguistic evolution but also gives insight into the evolutionary history of modern-day languages. This modeling effort achieved, through computational linguistics, what would otherwise have been impossible.

It is clear that the understanding of linguistic development in humans as well as throughout evolutionary time has been fantastically improved because of advances in computational linguistics. The ability to model and modify systems at will affords science an ethical method of testing hypotheses that would otherwise be intractable.

Structural approaches

To create better computational models of language, an understanding of language's structure is crucial. To this end, the English language has been meticulously studied using computational approaches to better understand how the language works on a structural level. One of the most important pieces of being able to study linguistic structure is the availability of large linguistic corpora or samples. This grants computational linguists the raw data necessary to run their models and gain a better understanding of the underlying structures present in the vast amount of data which is contained in any single language. One of the most cited English linguistic corpora is the Penn Treebank. Derived from widely-different sources, such as IBM computer manuals and transcribed telephone conversations, this corpus contains over 4.5 million words of American English. This corpus has been primarily annotated using part-of-speech tagging and syntactic bracketing and has yielded substantial empirical observations related to language structure.

Theoretical approaches to the structure of languages have also been developed. These works allow computational linguistics to have a framework within which to work out hypotheses that will further the understanding of the language in a myriad of ways. One of the original theoretical theses on the internalization of grammar and structure of language proposed two types of models. In these models, rules or patterns learned increase in strength with the frequency of their encounter. The work also created a question for computational linguists to answer: how does an infant learn a specific and non-normal grammar (Chomsky normal form) without learning an overgeneralized version and getting stuck? Theoretical efforts like these set the direction for research to go early in the lifetime of a field of study, and are crucial to the growth of the field.

Structural information about languages allows for the discovery and implementation of similarity recognition between pairs of text utterances. For instance, it has recently been proven that based on the structural information present in patterns of human discourse, conceptual recurrence plots can be used to model and visualize trends in data and create reliable measures of similarity between natural textual utterances. This technique is a strong tool for further probing the structure of human discourse. Without the computational approach to this question, the vastly complex information present in discourse data would have remained inaccessible to scientists.

Information regarding the structural data of a language is available for English as well as other languages, such as Japanese. Using computational methods, Japanese sentence corpora were analyzed and a pattern of log-normality was found in relation to sentence length. Though the exact cause of this lognormality remains unknown, it is precisely this sort of information which computational linguistics is designed to uncover. This information could lead to further important discoveries regarding the underlying structure of Japanese and could have any number of effects on the understanding of Japanese as a language. Computational linguistics allows for very exciting additions to the scientific knowledge base to happen quickly and with very little room for doubt.

Without a computational approach to the structure of linguistic data, much of the information that is available now would still be hidden under the vastness of data within any single language. Computational linguistics allows scientists to parse huge amounts of data reliably and efficiently, creating the possibility for discoveries unlike any seen in most other approaches.

Production approaches

The production of language is equally as complex in the information it provides and the necessary skills which a fluent producer must have. That is to say, comprehension is only half the problem of communication. The other half is how a system produces language, and computational linguistics has made interesting discoveries in this area.

In a now famous paper published in 1950 Alan Turing proposed the possibility that machines might one day have the ability to "think". As a thought experiment for what might define the concept of thought in machines, he proposed an "imitation test" in which a human subject has two text-only conversations, one with a fellow human and another with a machine attempting to respond like a human. Turing proposes that if the subject cannot tell the difference between the human and the machine, it may be concluded that the machine is capable of thought. Today this test is known as the Turing test and it remains an influential idea in the area of artificial intelligence.

 One of the earliest and best-known examples of a computer program designed to converse naturally with humans is the ELIZA program developed by Joseph Weizenbaum at MIT in 1966. The program emulated a Rogerian psychotherapist when responding to written statements and questions posed by a user. It appeared capable of understanding what was said to it and responding intelligently, but in truth, it simply followed a pattern matching routine that relied on only understanding a few keywords in each sentence. Its responses were generated by recombining the unknown parts of the sentence around properly translated versions of the known words. For example, in the phrase "It seems that you hate me" ELIZA understands "you" and "me" which matches the general pattern "you [some words] me", allowing ELIZA to update the words "you" and "me" to "I" and "you" and replying "What makes you think I hate you?". In this example ELIZA has no understanding of the word "hate", but it is not required for a logical response in the context of this type of psychotherapy.

Some projects are still trying to solve the problem which first started computational linguistics off as its field in the first place. However, methods have become more refined, and consequently, the results generated by computational linguists have become more enlightening. To improve computer translation, several models have been compared, including hidden Markov models, smoothing techniques, and the specific refinements of those to apply them to verb translation. The model which was found to produce the most natural translations of German and French words was a refined alignment model with a first-order dependence and a fertility model. They also provide efficient training algorithms for the models presented, which can give other scientists the ability to improve further on their results. This type of work is specific to computational linguistics and has applications that could vastly improve understanding of how language is produced and comprehended by computers.

Work has also been done in making computers produce language in a more naturalistic manner. Using linguistic input from humans, algorithms have been constructed which are able to modify a system's style of production based on a factor such as linguistic input from a human, or more abstract factors like politeness or any of the five main dimensions of personality. This work takes a computational approach via parameter estimation models to categorize the vast array of linguistic styles we see across individuals and simplify it for a computer to work in the same way, making human–computer interaction much more natural.

Text-based interactive approach
Many of the earliest and simplest models of human–computer interaction, such as ELIZA for example, involve a text-based input from the user to generate a response from the computer. By this method, words typed by a user trigger the computer to recognize specific patterns and reply accordingly, through a process known as keyword spotting.

Speech-based interactive approach
Recent technologies have placed more of an emphasis on speech-based interactive systems. These systems, such as Siri of the iOS operating system, operate on a similar pattern-recognizing technique as that of text-based systems, but with the former, the user input is conducted through speech recognition. This branch of linguistics involves the processing of the user's speech as sound waves and the interpreting of the acoustics and language patterns for the computer to recognize the input.

Comprehension approaches
Much of the focus of modern computational linguistics is on comprehension. With the proliferation of the internet and the abundance of easily accessible written human language, the ability to create a program capable of understanding human language would have many broad and exciting possibilities, including improved search engines, automated customer service, and online education.

Early work in comprehension included applying Bayesian statistics to the task of optical character recognition, as illustrated by Bledsoe and Browing in 1959 in which a large dictionary of possible letters was generated by "learning" from example letters and then the probability that any one of those learned examples matched the new input was combined to make a final decision. Other attempts at applying Bayesian statistics to language analysis included the work of Mosteller and Wallace (1963) in which an analysis of the words used in The Federalist Papers was used to attempt to determine their authorship (concluding that Madison most likely authored the majority of the papers).

In 1971 Terry Winograd developed an early natural language processing engine capable of interpreting naturally written commands within a simple rule-governed environment. The primary language parsing program in this project was called SHRDLU, which was capable of carrying out a somewhat natural conversation with the user giving it commands, but only within the scope of the toy environment designed for the task. This environment consisted of different shaped and colored blocks, and SHRDLU was capable of interpreting commands such as "Find a block which is taller than the one you are holding and put it into the box." and asking questions such as "I don't understand which pyramid you mean." in response to the user's input. While impressive, this kind of natural language processing has proven much more difficult outside the limited scope of the toy environment. Similarly, a project developed by NASA called LUNAR was designed to provide answers to naturally written questions about the geological analysis of lunar rocks returned by the Apollo missions. These kinds of problems are referred to as question answering.

Initial attempts at understanding spoken language were based on work done in the 1960s and 1970s in signal modeling where an unknown signal is analyzed to look for patterns and to make predictions based on its history. An initial and somewhat successful approach to applying this kind of signal modeling to language was achieved with the use of hidden Markov models as detailed by Rabiner in 1989. This approach attempts to determine probabilities for the arbitrary number of models that could be being used in generating speech as well as modeling the probabilities for various words generated from each of these possible models. Similar approaches were employed in early speech recognition attempts starting in the late 70s at IBM using word/part-of-speech pair probabilities.

More recently these kinds of statistical approaches have been applied to more difficult tasks such as topic identification using Bayesian parameter estimation to infer topic probabilities in text documents.

Applications

Applied computational linguistics is largely equivalent with natural language processing. Example applications for end users include speech recognition software, such as Apple's Siri feature, spellcheck tools, speech synthesis programs, which are often used to demonstrate pronunciation or help disabled people, and machine translation programs and websites, such as Google Translate.

Computational linguistics are also helpful in situations involving social media and the Internet, e.g., for providing content filters in chatrooms or on website searches, for grouping and organizing content through social media mining, document retrieval and clustering. For instance, if a person searches "red, large, four-wheeled vehicle," to find pictures of a red truck, the search engine will still find the information desired by matching words such as "four-wheeled" with "car".

Computational approaches are also important to support linguistic research, e.g., in corpus linguistics or historical linguistics. As for the study of change over time, computational methods can contribute to the modeling and identification of language families (see further quantitative comparative linguistics or phylogenetics), as well as the modeling of changes in sound and meaning.

Legacy
The subject of computational linguistics has had a recurring impact on popular culture:
 The Star Trek franchise features heavily classical NLP applications, most notably machine translation (universal translator), natural language user interfaces and question answering.
 The 1983 film WarGames features a young computer hacker who interacts with an artificially intelligent supercomputer.
 A 1997 film, Conceiving Ada, focuses on Ada Lovelace, considered one of the first computer programmers, as well as themes of computational linguistics.
 Her, a 2013 film, depicts a man's interactions with the "world's first artificially intelligent operating system."
 The 2014 film The Imitation Game follows the life of computer scientist Alan Turing, developer of the Turing Test.
 The 2015 film Ex Machina centers around human interaction with artificial intelligence.
 The 2016 film Arrival, based on Ted Chiang's Story of Your Life, takes a whole new approach of linguistics to communicate with advanced alien race called heptapods.

See also

 Artificial intelligence in fiction
 Collostructional analysis
 Computational lexicology
 Computational Linguistics (journal)
 Computational models of language acquisition
 Computational semantics
 Computational semiotics
 Computer-assisted reviewing
 Dialog systems
 Glottochronology
 Grammar induction
 Human speechome project
 Internet linguistics
 Lexicostatistics
 Natural language processing
 Natural language user interface
 Quantitative linguistics
 Semantic relatedness
 Semantometrics
 Systemic functional linguistics
 Translation memory
 Universal Networking Language

References

Further reading

 
 Steven Bird, Ewan Klein, and Edward Loper (2009). Natural Language Processing with Python. O'Reilly Media. .
 Daniel Jurafsky and James H. Martin (2008). Speech and Language Processing, 2nd edition. Pearson Prentice Hall. .
 Mohamed Zakaria KURDI (2016). Natural Language Processing and Computational Linguistics: speech, morphology, and syntax, Volume 1. ISTE-Wiley. .
 Mohamed Zakaria KURDI (2017). Natural Language Processing and Computational Linguistics: semantics, discourse, and applications, Volume 2. ISTE-Wiley. .

External links

 Association for Computational Linguistics (ACL)
 ACL Anthology of research papers
 ACL Wiki for Computational Linguistics
 CICLing annual conferences on Computational Linguistics
 Computational Linguistics – Applications workshop
 
 Language Technology World
 Resources for Text, Speech and Language Processing
 The Research Group in Computational Linguistics

 
Formal sciences
Cognitive science
Computational fields of study